Abou Diop (born 6 October 1993) is a Senegalese professional footballer who plays as a striker for Italian  club Picerno.

Club career

Torino
He arrived at Torino on trial in early 2011 and was signed shortly after. The club had many bureaucratic difficulties in registering him, as Torino were prohibited from signing a non-European player before the age of 18. In the 2012–13 season he managed to collect several appearances for the first team.

Loans to Juve Stabia and Crotone
On 31 July 2013, he was loaned to Juve Stabia in Serie B where he made his debut on 24 August against Pescara. He scored his only goal of the season on 31 August in a 1–2 loss against Spezia. He was recalled by Torino in the Winter transfer window and loaned to Crotone on 24 January, but failed to break into the first team.

Loans to Ternana and Matera
Returning to Turin in the late summer, he was loaned to Ternana, in Serie B. After a very disappointing first round (only 132 minutes played), the Umbrian club decided to send him back to Turin during the winter transfer window, which loaned him to Matera, a team in Lega Pro.

Loans to Lecce and Juve Stabia
On 31 August 2015, the closing day for the transfer market, he moved to Lecce in Lega Pro.

Paganese
On 28 July 2019, he joined Paganese.

Picerno
On 22 September 2022, Diop signed with Picerno.

References

External links

1993 births
Living people
People from Dakar
Association football forwards
Senegalese footballers
Torino F.C. players
S.S. Juve Stabia players
F.C. Crotone players
Ternana Calcio players
F.C. Matera players
U.S. Lecce players
Bassano Virtus 55 S.T. players
Paganese Calcio 1926 players
AZ Picerno players
Serie A players
Serie B players
Serie C players
Senegalese expatriate footballers
Expatriate footballers in Italy
Senegalese expatriate sportspeople in Italy